Evan King and Hunter Reese were the defending champions but only Reese chose to defend his title, partnering André Göransson. Reese lost in the first round to Treat Huey and Fabrice Martin.

Martín Cuevas and Paolo Lorenzi won the title after defeating Luke Bambridge and Jonny O'Mara 7–6(7–5), 7–6(8–6) in the final.

Seeds

Draw

References

External links
 Main draw

Sarasota Open - Doubles
2019 Doubles